Yekaterina Gennadiyevna Nikolayeva (born 5 October 1995) is a Russian ice hockey player for HC St. Petersburg and the Russian national team.

She participated at the 2016 IIHF Women's World Championship.

References

External links

1995 births
Living people
Russian women's ice hockey defencemen
Ice hockey players at the 2018 Winter Olympics
Olympic ice hockey players of Russia
Sportspeople from Saratov
Universiade medalists in ice hockey
Universiade gold medalists for Russia
Universiade silver medalists for Russia
Competitors at the 2013 Winter Universiade
Competitors at the 2015 Winter Universiade
Competitors at the 2017 Winter Universiade
HC Tornado players
Ice hockey players at the 2022 Winter Olympics